Giuseppe Iamonte (1949 in Melito di Porto Salvo – 28 August 2019)         
was an Italian criminal and a member of the 'Ndrangheta. He was a fugitive since 1993 and included in the list of most wanted fugitives in Italy until his capture in May 2005.

He was the son of the notorious historical mob boss of the clan, Natale Iamonte, originally based in Melito di Porto Salvo on the Ionic coast of Calabria, yet the reach of the mob members quickly spread throughout Italy.

He was arrested on May 14, 2005, to serve a 20-year sentence on charges of mafia association and drug trafficking.

His brother Vincenzo Iamonte, also wanted since 1993, was arrested two and half months later on July 30, 2005.

References

'Ndranghetisti
People from the Province of Reggio Calabria
1949 births
2019 deaths
Italian drug traffickers